Jean-Michel Bernard (born 23 November 1961) is a French pianist, composer, educator, orchestrator, and music producer. He is well known for regularly writing, performing, and scoring for films, such as The Science of Sleep, Hugo, Paris-Manhattan, Ca$h, and Be Kind Rewind.

Early life and career beginnings 

Bernard began playing the piano at the age of two. When he was 14, he was awarded first place at the Bordeaux Conservatory and later graduated from the École Normale de Musique de Paris. At 19, he recorded with the Royal Philharmonic Orchestra in London, whilst pursuing a career as a jazz musician and performing with prominent jazz artists including Wild Bill Davis, Jimmy Woode (Duke Ellington's bassist) and Eddie "Lockjaw" Davis.

From 1987 to 1991 he worked as musical director and conductor of the successful radio show L’Oreille en Coin on National Public Radio France Inter. Between 2000 and 2003, he performed with the Ray Charles Quartet on the European and Australian tours as organist and conductor, “this guy is a genius” Ray used to say concerning Bernard. He also scored many documentaries and commercials during the 1990s.
His career as a composer began with animated films, followed by collaborations with masters such as Lalo Schifrin and Ennio Morricone.
He frequently works with director Michel Gondry and has composed songs for films including Human Nature and he scored The Science of Sleep, which screened at the Sundance Film Festival and Berlin Film Festival. He was nominated for the World Soundtrack Awards in 2007 as Discovery of the Year and won the France Musique/UCMF award at the Cannes Film Festival the same year for this movie.

In 2003, Bernard wrote the music for TF1's À prendre ou à laisser, the French version of Deal or No Deal.

In 2008 he scored the music for Gondry's Be Kind Rewind, Cash by Eric Besnard, and A Pain in the Ass by Francis Veber. The same day Be Kind Rewind was shown at the Sundance Festival, Bernard performed alongside rapper/singer Mos Def and Gondry, an avid drummer.

The following year, the Cannes Film Festival invited him to represent France in the film music concert program. He also received an award for his achievement outside of his native country from the European Union of Film Music Composers (UCMF) and was appointed as sound designer for both HBO's channel and website.

He has collaborated with French actress and director Fanny Ardant on two of her films, Chimères Absentes and Cadences Obstinées starring Gérard Depardieu and worked on Academy Award-winning Hugo by Martin Scorsese. He scored the music of Love Punch by Joel Hopkins starring Pierce Brosnan and Emma Thompson, Love at First Child by Anne Giafferi and Money by Georgian director Gela Babluani. Bernard has conducted master classes at the Cannes Film Festival as well as in Montreal, Angers, La Rochelle, Kraków, Cologne and in Aubagne, where he performed a live version of Jazz For Dogs, an album co-created with Kimiko Ono and featuring a number of prestigious guests including Fanny Ardant, Francis Lai and Laurent Korcia.

In 2014, Bernard began teaching film music classes at the Paris Conservatory and was guest of honor with Michael Giacchino at the Audi Talent Awards in Paris with the Paris Symphonic Orchestra, at Braunschweig Festival and at Soundtrack Cologne Festival.
He scored “Terra”, a contemporary dance project which premiered at the Coronet in London in March 2016 and participated as composer, arranger and performer on The Avalanches long-awaited second album "Wildflower which just got gold certified album 2018.
His most recent project is an album celebrating the legendary Lalo Schifrin entitled Jean-Michel Bernard plays Lalo Schifrin which includes 3 piano duets with the master himself. The album will be released in 2017 with concerts in Los Angeles, Paris, and Japan, at the Tokyo Blue Note Jazz Festival.
Money by Gela Babluani has been awarded at the Beuxelles film festival (best film, best director).
Bernard won the Grand Prix Sacem 2017 for best composer for screen at la Salle Pleyel in Paris.
He is a Steinway Artist since 2018.

Bernard will tour around the world in 2018 with his new piano recital "Play Piano Play" (USA, Japan Yokohama French film music Festival, Fimucité 12 in Tenerife etc.) as well as a conference at the Geidai University in Tokyo.

He played for the 2018 opening ceremony at the Directors Guild of America theater in Los Angeles a concert homage to and with Lalo Schifrin and at the Steinway Beverly Hills Gallery.

Career
He was elected to the administrative board of the Union des compositeurs de musique de film (UCMF) (Union of Film Music Composers).

In May 2016, Bernard was a guest at the Kraków Film Music Festival alongside Harry Gregson-Williams.
In May 2017 he performed at the Kraków Film Music Festival his piano recital "cinematic Piano", one of the highlight of the festival.

Bernard contributed as composer and arranger on The Avalanches' second studio album Wildflower on songs featuring Danny Brown, Jonathan Donahue, MF Doom, and Biz Markie. He is credited on three tracks. He will tour in Japan in October 2016 invited by the French Institute for series of concerts and conferences for the Tokyo Film Festival.

Filmography

Soundtrack composer

 1990: Jours tranquilles à Clichy by Claude Chabrol
 1991: Madame Bovary by Claude Chabrol
 1999: L'Âme sœur by Jean-Marie Bigard
 2006: The Science of Sleep by Michel Gondry (award UCMF/France Musique Cannes 2007, awarded festival BO de Paris, nomination World soundtrack awards)
 2007: Ma place au soleil by Éric de Montalier
 2007: Détrompez-vous by Bruno Dega
 2008: Be Kind Rewind  by Michel Gondry
 2008: Ca$h by Éric Besnard
 2008: A pain in the ass by Francis Veber
 2008: Freud's Magic Powder by Edouard Getaz
 2010: Vieilles Canailles, téléfilm by Arnaud Sélignac
 2011: Hugo Cabret de Martin Scorsese (nomination Oscars 2012)
 2011: Qui an envie d'être aimé ? by Anne Giafferi
 2011: Chimères absentes by Fanny Ardant
 2011: Bienvenue à bord by Éric Lavaine
 2012: Paris-Manhattan by Sophie Lellouche with Woody Allen
 2012: L'Oncle Charles by Étienne Chatiliez
 2013: Love Punch by Joel Hopkins
 2013: Cadences obstinées by Fanny Ardant
 2013: Des frères et des sœurs by Anne Giafferi (award festival de La Rochelle 2013)
 2014: La Vie à l'envers by Anne Giafferi
 2014: Rester là by Fabien Daphy
 2014: De quoi je me mêle by Pablo Larcuen
 2015:Love at First Child'' by Anne Giafferi
 2017: Money by Gela Babluani (13 Tzameti, grand prize Sundance and Venise) awarded at Bruxelles film festival
 2018: With my own two hands by Michael Barocas, grand prix five continents film music festival for best music
 2019: Ni une ni deux by Anne Giafferi with Mathilde Seigner
 2019: ballad for a pierced heart by Yiannis Economides
 2022: Heureusement qu'on s'a by Anne Giafferi

Discography

 1991: Yellow Cow (with the Paris Philharmonic orchestra, soloist Eric Marienthal)
 1999: stories Marchand (cd France Inter)
 2002: French Cinema-Bruton Music
 2005: Message to Ray
 2006: The Science of Sleep
 2008: Original Soundtrack Be Kind Rewind
 2008: Original Soundtrack Cash
 2011: Original Soundtrack of Who wants to be loved?
 2011: Original Soundtrack Welcome aboard
 2011: Original Soundtrack of Hugo
 2012: Original Soundtrack of Paris-Manhattan
 2013: Original Soundtrack The Love Punch
 2013: Original Soundtrack of obsessive rhythms
 2014: Jazz for Dogs
 2014: Original Soundtrack Life upside
 2015: Original Soundtrack Angel and Gabrielle (Love at first child)
 2016: Original Soundtrack of "Terra" contemporary dance, first in London in March 2016
 2017/18: album Varese Sarabande-Cristal/Sony "Jean-Michel Bernard plays Lalo Schifrin"
 2018: Jean-Michel Bernard live in Paris (@ Steinway hall)
 2019: Sally Stevens sings, Jean-Michel Bernard plays (Lakeshore records)
 2022: The singular world of Jerry Goldsmith as seen by Jean-Michel Bernard (Cristal records)
 2022: Piano Cinéma (Sony Masterworks)

Awards

2007: France Musique/UCMF prize at Cannes Film Festival 2007 for best score for The Science of Sleep by Michel Gondry
2007: Public prize Paris Cinema Festival for The Science of Sleep by Michel Gondry
2007: Nomination "discovery of the year"  World Soundtracks Awards
2009: Best European composer UCMF-FFACE at Cannes Film Festival
2014: prize homage  Audi Talents Awards Paris Film Music Festival at Le Grand Rex
2017: grand prix Sacem for Best composer for films career
2018: Album Wildflower (The Avalanches) Gold certified
 2018: Grand Prix five continents fill awards for best score (with my own two hands)
 2021: nomination @ the Greek Iris Awards for best score (ballad for a pierced heart)

References

1961 births
Living people
École Normale de Musique de Paris alumni
Place of birth missing (living people)
French film score composers